Raymond Wilson (born 8 September 1968) is a Scottish singer and guitarist, vocalist in the post-grunge band Stiltskin and in Genesis from 1996 to 2000.

Early career and Stiltskin 
Before starting a band called Guaranteed Pure in the 1990s, which featured himself along with Paul Holmes (keyboards), Steve Wilson (guitars), John Haimes (bass) and Chris Cavanagh (drums)., he joined Edinburgh Band Strategy in 1987 recording and independently releasing a demo titled Second Move. Guaranteed Pure released an album called Swing Your Bag, the title track of which was included on a compilation album on the label of Fish entitled The Funny Farm Project : Outpatients '93. He then joined Stiltskin; they released one album and had a No. 1 hit in the UK with the single "Inside".

Genesis 
Wilson joined Genesis as the band's lead singer after Phil Collins officially announced his departure in March 1996. Genesis founder members Tony Banks and Mike Rutherford were handed a CD of the Stiltskin album The Mind's Eye from Virgin Records executives. They were impressed with Wilson's vocal abilities and had their manager, Tony Smith, contact him for an audition. Wilson was announced as the new lead singer of Genesis in June 1997. Their only album with Wilson, ...Calling All Stations..., was released that September and became a top 10 worldwide hit, except for the U.S. where it reached No. 54 on the Billboard 200 album chart. The album was re-issued in 2007. Genesis toured Europe in winter 1997 spring 1998, but the American leg was cancelled due to low ticket sales. The band went on an extended hiatus after the critical failure of the album.

In May 2001, during an interview with Dave Negrin for website WorldofGenesis.com, Wilson said: They basically phoned me up and said, "Ray, we're not continuing." I've never really felt that I was out of the band as such; it's just that the band doesn't exist any more (laughs). When I heard that, it was just after the Cut tour, about a year and a half ago. I've read some articles saying that I was fired and stuff, but to be fair to them, they didn't phone me up and say, "Ray, you're fired. We're going to carry on and we're going to get somebody else to sing." Or, "We're going to carry on and get Phil back." There was never any of that. They just said, "We've decided not to continue because the market doesn't want us." I think they didn't want to completely close the door to ever doing anything again.

Solo career 

In 1999, Wilson released the album Millionairhead with a solo project called Cut_. It was remastered in 2007 with three additional songs added.

In 2003, he released a solo album under his own name entitled Change. The next year, he released another studio album entitled The Next Best Thing, which included a new version of the Stiltskin hit "Inside". In 2006, he released another Stiltskin album called She, and in 2007 a Stiltskin live CD featuring (amongst others) 8 of the 12 songs from She. This live CD was recorded 25 October 2006, at Harmonie, Bonn, Germany.

DJ and trance producer Armin van Buuren has produced remixes of the songs "Another Day" (retitled "Yet Another Day") and "Gypsy" from Millionairhead. Both remixes have been released on van Buuren's own albums, and "Yet Another Day" was also released as a single.

In 2014, the first Ray Wilson biography, Gypsy, by journalist Mario Giammetti, was published in Italy (Edizioni Segno).

In June 2016, his new solo album Song for a Friend was released, which included ten unreleased acoustic tracks with a cover of Pink Floyd's "High Hopes." The original idea for the album title was Backseat Drivers. It was to be a double album. Wilson wanted to have one CD with acoustic music and a second CD with electric music. He then decided to split the two. In an interview he explained the decision was taken because the acoustic version of Song for a Friend would not have got the attention it deserves. The second disc (the electric and rockier collection of new songs) was later released in September of the same year as a stand-alone new album called Makes Me Think of Home.

On 7 and 8 September 2018, Wilson gave two exclusive concerts in Poznań at Zamek Culture Centre to celebrate his 50th birthday. Those two special nights titled "50th Celebration Birthday Concerts" saw Wilson performing only Genesis (and band members) material during the first night, while his solo material from his various projects (solo, Stiltskin and Cut_) on the second date. This was the first time he played a full concert without any Genesis songs since his tenure with the band.

Concerts with Steve Hackett 
In 2013, Wilson joined Steve Hackett for the latter's Genesis Revisited II Tour as a guest singer. He was featured in a special edition of the Genesis Revisited II album on the track "Carpet Crawlers". It was the first time since 1998 that Wilson had worked with a fellow Genesis member, albeit one he had not performed with as a member of the band.

Discography

Solo releases 
Studio albums
 Change (2003) – No. 88 Germany
 The Next Best Thing (2004)
 Propaganda Man (2008)
 Chasing Rainbows (2013) – No. 57 Germany
 Song for a Friend (2016)
 Makes Me Think of Home (2016) – No. 88 Germany
 The Weight of Man (2021)

Live albums
 Live and Acoustic (2002) (previously entitled "Unplugged")
 Ray Wilson Live (2005)
 An Audience and Ray Wilson (2006) (limited edition CD and download)
 Ray Wilson and the Berlin Symphony Ensemble, Genesis Klassik Live in Berlin (2009)
 Ray Wilson and the Berlin Symphony Ensemble, Genesis Classic Live in Poznan (2011)
 Genesis VS Stiltskin - 20 Years and More (2014) – No. 21 Germany
 Up Close and Personal - Live at SWR1 (2014)
 Time and Distance (2017)
ZDF@BAUHAUS May 20, 2018 (2018)

Greatest Hits 
 Upon My Life (2019)

Singles
 "Change" (March 2003)
 "Yet Another Day" (April 2003) – No. 70 United Kingdom
 "Goodbye Baby Blue" (September 2003)
 "These Are the Changes" (June 2004)

Stiltskin 
Studio albums
The Mind's Eye (1994) – No. 12 UK, No. 11 Germany, No. 10 Austria, No. 76 Netherlands, No. 13 Sweden, No. 13 Switzerland,
She (2006)
Unfulfillment (2011)

Live albums
Stiltskin Live (2007)

Singles
"Inside" (1994) – No. 1 UK, No. 5 Germany, No. 2 Austria, No. 9 France, No. 7 Netherlands, No. 5 Norway, No. 4 Sweden, No. 5 Switzerland, No. 40 Australia, No. 20 New Zealand
"Footsteps" (1994) – No. 34 UK, No. 34 Switzerland, No. 36 New Zealand
"Rest in Peace" (1995) – No. 47 UK
"She" (2006)
"Lemon Yellow Sun" (2006)
"First Day Of Change" (2011, Promo)

Genesis 
Studio albums
Calling All Stations (1997) – No. 2 UK, No. 54 US

Singles
"Congo" (September 1997) – No. 29 UK, No. 35 Austria, No. 31 Germany, No. 32 Switzerland, No. 25 US Billboard Mainstream Rock Tracks
"Shipwrecked" (December 1997) – No. 54 UK, No. 82 Germany
"Not About Us" (March 1998) – No. 66 UK, No. 81 Germany

Cut_ 
Studio albums
Millionairhead (1999)

Singles
"Another Day" (1999; Germany-only single)
"Sarah" (1999)
"Millionairhead" / "Sarah" (1999; radio promo)

Guaranteed Pure 
Swing Your Bag (1993)
CD Artwork by Philip Paterson

Collaborations 
2000 "Big City Nights" (with Scorpions) (Moment of Glory)
2002 "Love Supreme" Turntablerocker (Smile)
2003 "Good Time Love" (with Amanda Lyon) (A tribute to Frank Miller: various artists album)
2003 "Yet Another Day" (with Armin Van Buuren) (76) – No. 70 UK, No. 34 Netherlands
2005 "Gypsy" (with Armin Van Buuren) (Shivers)
2005 "Roses" (with RPWL) (World Through My Eyes)
2005 "Roses (live)" & "Not about us (live)"(with RPWL) (Start the Fire: RPWL Live)
2009 "Show Me The Way" (with DJ Cosmo)
2010 "Should I Wait" (with Twentyeight) (In the Beginning)
2013 "Carpet Crawlers" (with Steve Hackett) (Genesis Revisited II: Selection)
2015 "Walking in Memphis" (with Tune Brothers)
2015 "Here Comes the Rain Again" (with Tune Brothers)
2015 "Easy Way Out" (with The Veterans)
2015 "Taking the Easy Way Out" (with The Veterans) (HOUSESESSION IBIZA IMS 2015 SAMPLER)
2017 "Bezustannie" (with Patrycja Markowska) (Krótka Płyta O Miłości)

Personal life 
Wilson is the cousin of Ian Wilson, better known as Ian Catskilkin, of the UK indie band, Art Brut.

Ray met his future wife Tyla Holmes in 2000 (she is the sister of Paul Holmes, the keyboard player in Wilson's then-band Guaranteed Pure). They started dating, and married in 2002. She began working as his assistant, and then tour manager. They separated at the end of 2006 but remained good friends, with Tyla keeping her managerial role even after the ending of their relationship. She later left the music industry and concentrated on a career as a personal trainer in Australia.

In 2007, after a concert in Poland, Wilson met the dancer Małgorzata Mielech, also known as Gosia. After a few months of dating, he left Edinburgh and moved to Poznań in September 2008. To celebrate their lasting love, in 2016 Ray wrote a song for Gosia entitled "Not Long 'Til Springtime": she appeared as main actor in the official video of the song. As of 2018, the couple were engaged. Despite Wilson being reluctant in showing and talking about his personal life, he and Gosia gave a major interview with an exclusive photoshoot showing the duo together for the famous Polish magazine "Pani" in August 2018.

References

External links

Scottish rock singers
21st-century Scottish male singers
Scottish baritones
Genesis (band) members
1968 births
Living people
People from Dumfries
Scottish emigrants to Poland
Virgin Records artists
Inside Out Music artists
20th-century Scottish male singers